Coimbra is a Portuguese surname. may refer to:
 Zico, real name Arthur Antunes Coimbra, Brazilian footballer and manager
 Thiago Coimbra, Brazilian footballer, Zico's son
 Eduardo Antunes Coimbra, Brazilian footballer and manager, Zico brother
 André Coimbra, Portuguese card game player
 Carlos Coimbra, Brazilian director
 Erika Coimbra, Brazilian volleyball player
 João Coimbra, Brazilian footballer
 Júlio César da Cruz Coimbra, Brazilian footballer
 Herlander Coimbra, Angolan basketball player
 Higor Coimbra, Brazilian footballer
 Milton Coimbra, Bolivian footballer
 Sérgio Mendes Coimbra, Brazilian footballer
 Welliton de Moraes Coimbra, Brazilian footballer known as Tozin (or Tozim)
 Coimbra (shipwreck), a shipwreck off the US east coast.

Portuguese-language surnames